Melinda Darlene Hunt (born July 7, 1970) is an American actress, producer and television writer, best known for creating and producing the Showtime series The Big C.

Career
As a writer, the credits of the Lebanon Junction, Kentucky native and Northwestern University alumnus include episodes of 90210, Will & Grace, The Goldbergs, and Save Me. She also created the  Showtime series The Big C, starring Laura Linney. The series revolved around the life of suburban wife and high-school teacher Cathy Jaminson, who is diagnosed with melanoma. The Big C premiered on August 16, 2010, and concluded on May 20, 2013. She was nominated for a Golden Globe for being a producer on the series. Hunt is also one of several executive producers of the Fox series Call Me Kat, which premiered on January 3, 2021. That show is set in Louisville, of which Lebanon Junction is located an hour's drive. Other executive producers on that series include Mayim Bialik and Jim Parsons.

As an actress, she is known for her recurring roles in television shows such as Parks and Recreation, Help Me Help You, and Suburgatory. In addition to television, she has appeared in the films I Heart Huckabees and Idiocracy.

Filmography

Television

Film

References

External links

Living people
American television producers
American women television producers
American television writers
American film actresses
American television actresses
Northwestern University alumni
People from Bullitt County, Kentucky
Screenwriters from Kentucky
American women television writers
1966 births
21st-century American women